Zenharkandi (also Romanized as Zenhārkandī; also known as Zīnhār) is a village in Ahmadabad Rural District, Takht-e Soleyman District, Takab County, West Azerbaijan Province, Iran. At the 2006 census, its population was 127, in 24 families.

References 

Populated places in Takab County